Judge McFadden may refer to:

 Christopher J. McFadden (born 1957), chief judge for the Georgia Court of Appeals
 Frank Hampton McFadden (1925–2020), judge of the United States District Court for the Northern District of Alabama
 Joseph J. McFadden (1916–1991), former chief justice of the Idaho Supreme Court
 Trevor N. McFadden (born 1978), district judge for the United States District Court for the District of Columbia

See also
 McFadden (disambiguation)